Hemicorallium is a genus of corals belonging to the family Coralliidae.

The species of this genus are found in Pacific and Atlantic Ocean.

Species

Species:

Hemicorallium abyssale 
Hemicorallium aurantiacum 
Hemicorallium bathyrubrum

References

Coralliidae
Octocorallia genera